Un'altra vita (Another Life) is a 1992 Italian comedy drama film directed by Carlo Mazzacurati.

For his performance Claudio Amendola won the David di Donatello for best supporting actor.

Cast 
Silvio Orlando:  Saverio
Adrianna Biedrzyńska:  Alia 
Claudio Amendola:  Mauro
Antonello Fassari:  Remo 
Monica Scattini:  Luisanna 
Pasquale Anselmo:  Jacobino 
Giorgio Tirabassi:  Vanni 
Luisa De Santis:  Assistant of Saverio
Kim Rossi Stuart: Luciano
Antonella Ponziani:  Rita 
Maciej Robakiewicz:  Lev

References

External links

1992 films
Italian comedy-drama films
Films directed by Carlo Mazzacurati
1992 comedy-drama films
1990s Italian films